The first season of the television series Arthur was originally broadcast on PBS in the United States from October 7 to November 15, 1996, and contains 30 episodes with each episode containing two 11-minute segments, making it the longest season of the show. Like seasons 2 and 3, this season was released on DVD in Europe only.

Production
According to an October 14, 1997 New York Daily News article, each episode this season reportedly cost around $400,000 to make (or $24 million for the entire season).

Episodes

References

General references 
 
 
 
 

1996 American television seasons
1996 Canadian television seasons
Arthur (TV series) seasons